Archalbot got its name from a small tree named Archale. It is sour in taste. Native Parajuli's of Archalbot were called Archalbote in previous time. It is located in Pokhara metropolitan city . Few hundred year ago, Archalbot use to have a different name (Simal patan) because there used to be large and big simal trees in today's Archalbot . Parajuli's are the native of this place beside this large number of Pun Magar have also migrated from Myagdi District and Parbat District.

References

External links
UN map of the municipalities of Lamjung District

Populated places in Kaski District